Hamilton House, also known as the Edna Cuddy Memorial House and Gardens, is a historic home located at Bethany, Harrison County, Missouri.  It was designed by architect Edmond Jacques Eckel and built in 1882.  It is a two-story, asymmetrical, Italianate style brick dwelling.  It has a low, truncated-hip roof with projecting cornice supported by concave, curved brackets.  It is open as a historic home by the Harrison County Historical Society.

It was listed on the National Register of Historic Places in 1985.

References

Historic house museums in Missouri
Houses on the National Register of Historic Places in Missouri
Italianate architecture in Missouri
Houses completed in 1882
Buildings and structures in Harrison County, Missouri
National Register of Historic Places in Harrison County, Missouri